is a Japanese footballer who plays as a defender for Albirex Niigata.

Club career
Takano made his professional debut in a 4–1 Emperor's Cup match against Zweigen Kanazawa.

Career statistics

Club

References

External links

2004 births
Living people
Japanese footballers
Association football defenders
Albirex Niigata players